Arrugada is a genus of leafhoppers in the subfamily Deltocephalinae. There are currently four described species of Arrugada and they are all endemic to Bolivia and Peru. The genus was formerly considered to be within its own separate subfamily within Cicadellidae; however, it is now recognized to be in its own tribe, Arrugadini, within the subfamily Deltocephalinae.

Species 
There are 4 described species of Arrugada:

 Arrugada affinis 
 Arrugada breviceps 
 Arrugada linnavuorii 
 Arrugada rugosa

References 

Deltocephalinae